The Tiffany electric car was manufactured by the Tiffany Electric Car Company of Flint, Michigan from 1913-14.  The Tiffany electric car was the successor to the Flanders electric car.  The vehicle was an open two-seater with sweeping body lines and powered by a Wagner Electric motor.  The vehicle was steered with a lever and had wire wheels and cycle mud guards. It cost US$750.

The Tiffany was only manufactured from October 1913 to March 1914, after which the Flanders name was revived.

References
 

Defunct motor vehicle manufacturers of the United States
Motor vehicle manufacturers based in Michigan
Defunct manufacturing companies based in Michigan